The discography of Colombian recording artist Manuel Turizo consists of one studio album and twenty-one singles (including three as featured artist).

Albums

Studio albums

Singles

As lead artist

As featured artist

Other charted songs

Guest appearances

Notes

References

Discographies of Colombian artists